The International Boxing Federation (IBF) is one of four major organizations recognized by the International Boxing Hall of Fame (IBHOF) which sanctions professional boxing bouts, alongside the World Boxing Association (WBA), World Boxing Council (WBC) and World Boxing Organization (WBO).

History
The IBF was preceded by the United States Boxing Association (USBA), a regional championship organization like the North American Boxing Federation (NABF). In 1983, at the WBA's annual convention, held in Puerto Rico, Robert W. "Bobby" Lee Sr., president of the USBA, lost in his bid to become WBA president against Gilberto Mendoza. Lee and others withdrew from the convention after the election, and decided to organize a third, world-level organization, to co-exist with the WBA and the WBC. Formed as USBA-International, the fledgling organization was later renamed the International Boxing Federation, based in New Jersey, where its main offices remain.

Bobby Lee had also been a New Jersey boxing commissioner until 1985, when, according to news reports, "he was suspended and fined by the Ethical Standards Commission for accepting contributions from fight promoters and casino executives."

The IBF's first world champion was Marvin Camel, a former WBC world cruiserweight champion who won the IBF's belt in the same division. During its first year of existence the IBF remained largely obscure, but by 1984 it decided to recognize Larry Holmes, Aaron Pryor, Marvin Hagler and Donald Curry, already established champions from other organizations, as IBF world champions. In Holmes' case, he relinquished his WBC title to accept the IBF's recognition. It established the IBF as the third sanctioning body, and a legitimate organization.

IBF men's world championship belts are red, whereas women's world championship belts are light blue.

20th-century bribery scandal
Despite achieving an appearance of legitimacy, subsequent to a three-year investigation started by 1996 charges levied by former heavyweight champion Michael Moorer; IBF's reputation was ruined in 1999 with founder Lee's indictment for racketeering and other violations for taking bribes in exchange for high boxer rankings. Indicted on federal racketeering and racketeering conspiracy charges were "president, Robert W. Lee, 65; his son and IBF liaison, Robert Lee Jr., 38; former IBF executive and Virginia boxing commissioner Donald William Brennan, 86; and South American IBF representative Francisco Fernandez." Lee was subsequently convicted of money-laundering and tax evasion in August 2000, then sentenced, in 2001, to 22 months in prison and fined $25,000.

In 2000, citing extortion, boxing promoter Bob Arum voluntarily testified to having paid IBF president Bobby Lee $100,000 in two installments in 1995, as the first half of a $200,000 bribe, through "middleman, Stanley Hoffman", adding that Lee had first demanded $500,000 to approve the Schulz-Foreman fight, but had settled for the lesser amount of $200,000 (half of which was never paid). Arum was sanctioned and fined $125,000 by the Nevada State Athletic Commission. Boxing promoters Cedric Kushner and Dino Duva also admitted to making similar payments to Lee.

21st-century management
The IBF was under federal observation from Lee's conviction through September 2004. Former Michigan Boxing Commissioner, WBA vice-president, boxing safety advocate and IBF interim president Hiawatha Knight (October 22, 1929 – October 22, 2014) became president following Lee's conviction, and was the first woman president of any world governing boxing organization. In 2001, Marian Muhammad assumed the presidency, followed by Daryl J. Peoples, who remained president as of 2018.

The IBF ran the "1st Annual Convention of IBF Muaythai" in Bangkok on 20–21 December 2017. Daryl Peoples, IBF president, attended the convention. The new champions of IBF Muay Thai were crowned in three weight divisions.

In response to the 2022 Russian invasion of Ukraine, the Federation blocked championship fights involving Russian and Belarusian boxers.

Current IBF world title holders
As of

Male

Female

Muay Thai world champions

See also
List of major boxing sanctioning bodies
List of IBF world champions
List of IBF female world champions
List of current world boxing champions
List of IBF Muay Thai world champions

References

External links

All-time IBF World champions - Reference book

 
Professional boxing organizations
Sports organizations established in 1983
Springfield Township, Union County, New Jersey
1983 establishments in the United States